The 2022 NCAA Division I men's basketball tournament involved 68 teams playing in a single-elimination tournament that determined the  National Collegiate Athletic Association (NCAA) Division I men's college basketball national champion for the 2021–22 season. The 83rd annual edition of the tournament began on March 15, 2022, and concluded with the championship game on April 4 at the Caesars Superdome in New Orleans, Louisiana, with the Kansas Jayhawks defeating the North Carolina Tar Heels, 72–69, overcoming a 16 point first half deficit (the largest deficit overcome in championship game history), to claim the school’s fourth national title. 

Big South Conference champion Longwood and Northeast Conference (NEC) champion Bryant made their tournament debuts. Bryant was eliminated in the First Four by Wright State, and Longwood was eliminated by Tennessee in the first round.

A major upset occurred on the first full day of the tournament, when 15-seed Saint Peter's upset 2-seed Kentucky, and subsequently became the third 15-seed to reach the Sweet 16 (the second consecutive year in which this occurred and third in the last nine years) and the first ever 15-seed to advance to the Elite Eight. This was the tenth time a 15-seed defeated a 2-seed overall, but it was the sixth time since 2012 this occurred. The defending champions Baylor were defeated by North Carolina in the second round, ensuring the defending champion and at least one top seed was eliminated before the regional semifinals for the fifth consecutive tournament, and at least one double-digit seed (this year, four: 15-seed Saint Peter's, 11-seeds Michigan and Iowa State, and 10-seed Miami) made the Sweet 16 for the fifth straight tournament. Also, when Kansas defeated Providence in the Sweet 16, the Jayhawks passed Kentucky for the most all time wins by a Division I program, with 2,354.

Tournament procedure

A total of 68 teams have been entered into the 2022 tournament. A total of 32 automatic bids were awarded to each program that won a conference tournament (with one exception, as the tournament winner in the ASUN Conference was ineligible, due to its transition from Division II). The remaining 36 bids were issued "at-large", with selections extended by the NCAA Selection Committee. The Selection Committee also seeded the entire field from 1 to 68.
 
Eight teams (the four lowest-seeded automatic qualifiers and the four lowest-seeded at-large teams) played in the First Four. The winners of these games advanced to the main bracket of the tournament.

The top four teams outside of the ranking (commonly known as the "first four out" in pre-tournament analyses) acted as standbys in the event a school is forced to withdraw before the start of the tournament due to COVID-19 protocols. Any recipient of an automatic bid would designate a replacement from within their own conference if they need to withdraw. Otherwise, the replacement teams were as follows, in order: 

Once the tournament starts, any team that is forced to withdraw will not be replaced; the bracket will not be reseeded, and the affected team's opponent will automatically advance to the next round.

2022 NCAA Tournament schedule and venues

After the 2020 tournament was cancelled and the 2021 tournament was held in a single location due to the COVID-19 pandemic, it was reverted to the standard format for the first time since 2019.

The sites selected to host each round of the 2022 tournament were:

First Four
March 15 and 16
University of Dayton Arena, Dayton, Ohio (Host: University of Dayton)

First and Second Rounds (Subregionals)
March 17 and 19
 Dickies Arena, Fort Worth, Texas (Host: Texas Christian University)
 Gainbridge Fieldhouse, Indianapolis, Indiana (Hosts: Horizon League and IUPUI)
 KeyBank Center, Buffalo, New York (Host: Metro Atlantic Athletic Conference, Niagara University and Canisius College)
 Moda Center, Portland, Oregon (Host: Oregon State University)
March 18 and 20
 Bon Secours Wellness Arena, Greenville, South Carolina (Hosts: Southern Conference and Furman University)
 Fiserv Forum, Milwaukee, Wisconsin (Host: Marquette University)
 PPG Paints Arena, Pittsburgh, Pennsylvania (Host: Duquesne University)
 Viejas Arena, San Diego, California (Host: San Diego State University)

Regional semifinals and finals (Sweet Sixteen and Elite Eight)
March 24 and 26
West Regional, Chase Center, San Francisco, California (Host: Pac-12 Conference)
South Regional, AT&T Center, San Antonio, Texas (Host: University of Texas at San Antonio)
March 25 and 27
East Regional, Wells Fargo Center, Philadelphia, Pennsylvania (Host: University of Pennsylvania)
Midwest Regional, United Center, Chicago, Illinois (Host: Northwestern University)

National semifinals and championship (final Four and championship)
April 2 and 4
 Caesars Superdome, New Orleans, Louisiana (Hosts: Tulane University and University of New Orleans) 

New Orleans hosted the Final Four for the sixth time, having previously hosted in 1982, 1987, 1993, 2003 and 2012.

Qualification and selection of teams

Automatic qualifiers

Tournament seeds

The tournament seeds and regions were determined through the NCAA basketball tournament selection process and were published by the selection committee after the brackets were released. This was the fifth consecutive tournament in which at least one of  the four #1 seeds repeated their #1 seeding from the year before.

*See First Four

Tournament bracket
All times are listed in Eastern Daylight Time (UTC−4)
* denotes overtime period</onlyinclude> 
** denotes double overtime period</onlyinclude>

First Four – Dayton, OH
The First Four games involve eight teams: the four overall lowest-ranked teams and the four lowest-ranked at-large teams.

West Regional – San Francisco, CA

West Regional Final

West Regional all-tournament team
 JD Notae – Arkansas
 Jaylin Williams – Arkansas
 Mark Williams – Duke
 Jeremy Roach – Duke
 Paolo Banchero – Duke (MOP)

East Regional – Philadelphia, PA

East Regional Final

East Regional all-tournament team
 Armando Bacot, North Carolina (MOP)
 Daryl Banks III, Saint Peter's
 Doug Edert, Saint Peter's
 Caleb Love, North Carolina
 Brady Manek, North Carolina

South Regional – San Antonio, TX

South Regional Final

South Regional all tournament team
 Jermaine Samuels – Villanova (MOP)
 Collin Gillespie – Villanova
 Caleb Daniels – Villanova
 Justin Moore – Villanova
 Jamal Shead – Houston

Midwest Regional – Chicago, IL

Midwest Regional Final

Midwest Regional all-tournament team
 Al Durham, Providence
 Kameron McGusty, Miami
 Christian Braun, Kansas
 David McCormack, Kansas
 Remy Martin, Kansas (MOP)

Final Four – New Orleans, Louisiana

National semifinals

 Related article: Carolina–Duke rivalry

National championship

Final Four all-tournament team
 Ochai Agbaji, Kansas (MOP)
 David McCormack, Kansas
 Armando Bacot, North Carolina
 Caleb Love, North Carolina
 Paolo Banchero, Duke

Game summaries and tournament notes

Upsets
Per the NCAA, "Upsets are defined as when the winner of the game was seeded five or more places lower than the team it defeated." The 2022 tournament saw a total of 13 upsets; 6 of them were in the first round, 5 of them were in the second round, one in the Sweet Sixteen, none in the Elite Eight, and one in the Final Four.

Record by conference

The FF, R64, R32, S16, E8, F4, CG, and NC columns indicate how many teams from each conference were in the first four, round of 64 (first round), round of 32 (second round), Sweet 16, Elite Eight, Final Four, championship game, and national champion, respectively.

Media coverage

Television

CBS Sports and Turner Sports have US television rights to the tournament. As part of a cycle that began in 2016, TBS televised the 2022 Final Four and the national championship game.  The Final Four and title game broadcasts were the last CBS Sports assignments for longtime director Bob Fishman, who retired from CBS Sports after 47 years (and 50 with CBS) and has been a director on 39 of the 40 Final Fours CBS/Turner have carried.

Television channels
Selection Show – CBS
First Four – truTV
First and Second Rounds – CBS, TBS, TNT, and truTV  
Regional semifinals and final (Sweet Sixteen and Elite Eight) – CBS and TBS
National semifinals (final Four) and championship – TBS, TNT, and truTV

Number of games per network
 CBS: 21
 TBS: 21
 TruTV: 16
 TNT: 15

Studio hosts
 Greg Gumbel (New York City and New Orleans) – First round, second round, Regionals, Final Four and National Championship Game
 Ernie Johnson (New York City, Atlanta, and New Orleans) – First round, second round, Regional Semi-finals, Final Four and National Championship Game
 Nabil Karim (Atlanta) – First Four, first round and Second round
 Adam Lefkoe (New York City) – First round and Second round (game breaks)

Studio analysts
 Charles Barkley (New York City and New Orleans) – First round, second round, Regionals, Final Four and National Championship Game
 Rex Chapman (Atlanta) – First Four, first round, second round and Regional Semi-finals
 Seth Davis (Atlanta and New Orleans) – First Four, first round, second round, Regional Semi-finals, Final Four and National Championship Game
 Scott Drew (Atlanta) – Regional Semi-finals
 Bob Huggins (Atlanta) – Second Round
 Bobby Hurley (New Orleans) – Final Four
 Clark Kellogg (New York City and New Orleans) – First round, second round, Regionals, Final Four and National Championship Game
 Frank Martin (Atlanta) – First round
 Candace Parker (Atlanta and New Orleans) – First Four, first round, second round, Regional Semi-finals and Final Four
 Kenny Smith (New York City and New Orleans) – First round, second round, Regionals, Final Four and National Championship Game
 Gene Steratore (New York City and New Orleans) (Rules Analyst) – First Four, first round, second round, Regionals, Final Four and National Championship Game
 Wally Szczerbiak (New York City) – Second Round

Commentary teams
 Jim Nantz/Bill Raftery/Grant Hill/Tracy Wolfson – First and Second Rounds at Greenville, South Carolina; West Regional at San Francisco, California; Final Four and National Championship at New Orleans, Louisiana
 Brian Anderson/Jim Jackson/Allie LaForce – First and Second Rounds at Fort Worth, Texas; South Regional at San Antonio, Texas
 Ian Eagle/Jim Spanarkel/Jamie Erdahl – First and Second Rounds at Indianapolis, Indiana; East Regional at Philadelphia, Pennsylvania
 Kevin Harlan/Reggie Miller/Dan Bonner/Dana Jacobson – First and Second Rounds at Pittsburgh, Pennsylvania; Midwest Regional at Chicago, Illinois
 Brad Nessler/Brendan Haywood/Evan Washburn – First and Second Rounds at Buffalo, New York
 Spero Dedes/Debbie Antonelli/AJ Ross – First and Second Rounds at Milwaukee, Wisconsin
 Andrew Catalon/Steve Lappas/Andy Katz – First and Second Rounds at Portland, Oregon
 Lisa Byington/Steve Smith/Avery Johnson/Lauren Shehadi – First and Second Rounds at San Diego, California
 Tom McCarthy/Steve Lavin/Avery Johnson/Jon Rothstein – First Four at Dayton, Ohio

Radio
Westwood One has exclusive radio rights to the entire tournament.

First Four
Lance Medow (first 3 games)/Dan Hoard (last game) and Stephen Bardo – at Dayton, Ohio

First and Second Rounds
Kevin Kugler and Robbie Hummel – Fort Worth, Texas
Brandon Gaudin and Austin Croshere – Indianapolis, Indiana
Scott Graham and Jon Crispin – Buffalo, New York
Ryan Radtke and Dan Dickau – Portland, Oregon
Bill Rosinski and Jordan Cornette – Greenville, South Carolina
Jason Benetti and Will Perdue – Milwaukee, Wisconsin
John Sadak and Fran Fraschilla – Pittsburgh, Pennsylvania
Dave Pasch and P. J. Carlesimo – San Diego, California

Regionals
Tom McCarthy and Will Perdue – East Regional at Philadelphia, Pennsylvania
Kevin Kugler and Robbie Hummel – Midwest Regional at Chicago, Illinois
Scott Graham and P. J. Carlesimo – South Regional at San Antonio, Texas
Ryan Radtke and Steve Lavin – West Regional at San Francisco, California

Final Four and National Championship
Kevin Kugler, P. J. Carlesimo, Clark Kellogg and Andy Katz – New Orleans, Louisiana

Internet

Video

Live video of games is available for streaming through the following means:

 NCAA March Madness Live (website and app, no CBS games on digital media players; access to games on WarnerMedia channels (TBS, TNT, truTV) required TV Everywhere authentication through provider)
 Paramount+ (only CBS games, service subscription required)
 CBS Sports website and app (only CBS games)
 Watch TBS website and app (only TBS games, required TV Everywhere authentication)
 Watch TNT website and app (only TNT games, required TV Everywhere authentication)
 Watch truTV website and app (only truTV games, required TV Everywhere authentication)
 Websites and apps of cable, satellite, and OTT providers of CBS, TBS, TNT, and truTV (access required subscription)

In addition, the March Madness app offered Fast Break, whiparound coverage of games similar to NFL RedZone.
 Dave Briggs, Tony Delk, Tim Doyle (first round), Josh Pastner (second round) (New York City)

Audio

Live audio of games is available for streaming through the following means:
 NCAA March Madness Live (website and app)
 Westwood One Sports website
 TuneIn (website and app, required TuneIn Premium subscription) 
 Websites and apps of Westwood One Sports affiliates

International
ESPN International had international rights to the tournament. Coverage uses CBS/Turner play-by-play teams until the Final Four.
 Brian Custer and Jay Bilas

See also
 2022 NCAA Division I women's basketball tournament
 2022 NCAA Division II men's basketball tournament
 2022 NCAA Division III men's basketball tournament
 2022 National Invitation Tournament
 2022 College Basketball Invitational
 2022 The Basketball Classic
 Carolina–Duke rivalry

Notes

References

Tournament
NCAA Division I men's basketball tournament
NCAA Division I men's basketball tournament
NCAA Division I men's basketball tournament
NCAA Division I men's basketball tournament